The Temple of Olympian Zeus or Olympeion or Olympieum can refer to the following ancient Greek temples:

 Temple of Olympian Zeus, Agrigento
 Temple of Olympian Zeus, Athens
 Temple of Zeus at Olympia, Greece, built in the fifth century BC
 Temple of Olympian Zeus, at Megara